Tallest
Tunisia
Tunisia